The 1934 Morgan Bears football team was an American football team that represented Morgan College as a member of the Colored Intercollegiate Athletic Association (CIAA) during the 1934 college football season. Led by fourth-year head coach Edward P. Hurt, the Bears compiled an overall record of 5–0–3 with a conference mark of 4–0–3, winning the CIAA title. Morgan shut out all eight of their opponents, scoring 96 points and allowing 0 on the season. After the season, Howard forfeited their tie with Morgan because of an ineligible player.

Schedule

References

Morgan
Morgan State Bears football seasons
College football undefeated seasons
Morgan Bears football